Joseph Solomon (died 17 October 1995) was a convicted murderer and was the most recent person to have been executed by Saint Lucia.

Solomon was convicted of murder and rape in 1979 and sentenced to death, which was mandatory for murder under Saint Lucian law. However, his sentence was commuted to life imprisonment by the government. In 1993, after serving fourteen years in prison, Solomon was pardoned and released from prison. The next year, Solomon was arrested for the murder of a woman who had employed him to be her gardener At his 1994 trial, he was again sentenced to death by hanging.

Solomon was executed on 17 October 1995, with another prisoner acting as the hangman. It was the first execution in Saint Lucia since 1986. Since Solomon's execution, no prisoner has been put to death by Saint Lucia.

See also
List of most recent executions by jurisdiction

References
Amnesty International, "Death Penalty News", December 1995, accessed 24 November 2008
Amnesty International, Amnesty International Report 1996: St Lucia, 1 January 1996, unhcr.org, accessed 24 November 2008
Hans Göran Franck, Klas Nyman, and William Schabas (2003). The Barbaric Punishment: Abolishing the Death Penalty (Leiden: Martinus Nijhoff Publishers) p. 118

Specific

1995 deaths
20th-century executions by Saint Lucia
People executed for murder
Executed Saint Lucian people
People executed by Saint Lucia by hanging
People convicted of murder by Saint Lucia
Saint Lucian rapists
Saint Lucian people convicted of murder
Recipients of Saint Lucian royal pardons
Year of birth missing